Virginia Ruano Pascual and Paola Suárez were the defending champions, but did not compete this year. Suárez went under a hip surgery in July 2005, missing the remainder of the season.

Lisa Raymond and Samantha Stosur won the title by defeating Cara Black and Rennae Stubbs 7–5, 6–1 in the final.

Seeds

Draw

Draw

References

External links
 Official results archive (ITF)
 Official results archive (WTA)

2005 Doubles
Fortis Championships Luxembourg - Doubles
2005 in Luxembourgian tennis